Hyperolius bolifambae (also known as Bolifamba reed frog or Medje reed frog) is a species of frog in the family Hyperoliidae. It is known from southeastern Nigeria, southern Cameroon, and southwestern Central African Republic, with an isolated record in northeastern Democratic Republic of the Congo (type locality of Hyperolius erythropus, now in synonymy); the latter record may be considered doubtful. It likely has a broader range towards south and east than currently documented, and the AmphibiaWeb includes Gabon and the Republic of the Congo in the distribution.

Etymology
The specific name bolifambae refers to its type locality, "Bolifamba", near Mount Cameroon.

Description
Adult males measure  and adult females  in snout–vent length. There are two distinct colour phases, "J" and "F". Juveniles and many mature males show phase J whereas mature females and some mature males show phase F. Phase J is characterized by yellow ventrum, whereas in phase F the ventrum is black with large white spots. In both cases, the dorsum is uniform yellow to brown. The flanks are darker chocolate-brown and clearly distinct from the dorsal colour. Sometimes there are chocolate-brown spots on the dorsum. Distinctive to this species, the dorsal surface of tibia is always bi-coloured: the front part is brown, and the hind part is yellow.

The male advertisement call is a high-pitched buzzing.

Habitat and conservation
Hyperolius bolifambae is a bush land species that occurs at elevations below  asl. It presumably also lives in secondary vegetation in the tropical forest belt. Breeding takes place in small ponds. It is locally common or abundant, and there are no known major threats to this adaptable species. It occurs in some protected areas, including the Korup National Park (Cameroon) and Dzanga-Ndoki National Park (Central African Republic).

References

bolifambae
Frogs of Africa
Amphibians of Cameroon
Amphibians of the Central African Republic
Amphibians of the Democratic Republic of the Congo
Amphibians of West Africa
Taxa named by Robert Mertens
Amphibians described in 1938
Taxonomy articles created by Polbot